Rhytiphora fasciata is a species of beetle in the family Cerambycidae. It was described by Thomas Blackburn in 1901, originally under the genus Symphyletes. It is known from Australia.

References

fasciata
Beetles described in 1901